The Corpus Reformatorum (Corp. Ref., Cor. Ref., C.R., CR) ( Halle (Saale), 1834 sqq.), is the general Latin title given to a large collection of Reformation writings. This collection, which runs to 101 volumes, contains reprints of the collected works of John Calvin, Philip Melanchthon, and Huldrych Zwingli, three of the leading Protestant reformers. Texts in the CR are written in either Latin, French or German (using Fraktur typefaces).

A collection of sixteenth century Catholic writings, intended as a counterpart to the Corpus Reformatorum, was begun by Professor Joseph Greving  (1868–1919) of the University of Bonn in 1915. It was  announced that same year in the Theologische Revue as a "Plan für ein Corpus Catholicorum" or "Plan for a Corpus Catholicorum"

History
The Corpus Reformatorum was founded through the efforts of German scholar and theologian Karl Gottlieb Bretschneider, who began planning for it sometime after 1827. From 1834 until his death in 1848, Bretschneider also served as its primary editor.

List of editors

Karl Gottlieb Bretschneider (1776-1848)
Heinrich Ernst Bindseil (1803-1876)
Edward (Eduard) Reuss (Reuß) (1804–1891)
August Edward (Eduard) Cunitz (Caunitz) (1812-1886)
Johann Wilhelm (Guilielmus) (William) Baum (1806-1878)
Emil Egli (1848-1908)
Georg Finsler (1819-1899)
Walther Köhler (1870-1946)

The Corpus Reformatorum online
These works are being digitized by Google Books. Not all volumes are currently available.  Many volumes which have been digitized are no longer available online.

Series I: Philip Melanchthon, Opera Quae Supersunt Omnia - Volumes 1- 28
Volumes 1-15 edited by Karl Gottlieb Bretschneider. Volumes 16-28 edited by Heinrich Ernst Bindseil.

CR 1 - 1834
CR 2 - 1835 
CR 3 - 1836
CR 4 - 1837 
CR 5 - 1838 
CR 6 - 1839 
CR 7 - 1840  
CR 8 - 1841
CR 9 - 1842 
CR 10 - 1842 
CR 11 - 1843 
CR 12 - 1844 
CR 13 - 1846 
CR 14 - 1847 
CR 15 - 1848 
CR 16 - 1850 
CR 17 - 1851 
CR 18 - 1852 
CR 19 - 1853
CR 20 - 1854 
CR 21 - 1854 
CR 22 - 1855 
CR 23 - 1855 
CR 24 - 1856 
CR 25 - 1856 
CR 26 - 1858 
CR 27 - 1859 
CR 28 - 1860

Series II: Ioannis Calvini, Opera Quae Supersunt Omnia – Volumes 29- 87
Edited by Guilielmus Baum, Eduardus Cunitz, Eduardus Reuss.
Opp. = Opera Quae Supersunt Omnia.

CR 29; Opp, 
CR  30; Opp. 2  - 1864
CR 31; Opp. 3 - 1865
CR 32; Opp.
CR 33; Opp. 5 - 1867
CR 34; Opp. 6 - 1867
CR 35; Opp. 7 - 1868
CR 37; Opp. 9 - 1870
CR 38; Opp. 10 (Pars Prior. & Pars Posterior.) - 1871 & 1872
CR 39; Opp. 
CR 40; Opp.12 - 1874
CR 41; Opp. 13 - 1875
CR 42; Opp. 
CR 43; Opp.
CR 44; Opp. 16 - 1877
CR 45; Opp.
CR 46; Opp.
CR 47; Opp. 
CR 48; Opp. 
CR 49; Opp. 21 - 1879
CR 50; Opp. 22 - 1880
CR 51; Opp.
CR 52; Opp. 
CR 53; Opp. 
CR 54; Opp. 
CR 55; Opp. 
CR 56; Opp.
CR 57; Opp.
CR 58; Opp.
CR 59; Opp.31 –1887
CR 60; Opp.32 – 1887
CR 61; Opp.33 – 1887
CR 62; Opp.34 –1887
 CR 63; Opp.35 – 1887
CR 64; Opp.36 –1888
CR 65; Opp.37 – 1888
CR  66; Opp.38 – 1888
CR 67; Opp.
CR 68; Opp.
CR 69; Opp.
CR 70; Opp.
CR  71; Opp.43 – 1890
CR 72; Opp.44 -1890
CR 73; Opp.45 – 1891
CR 74; Opp.46 –1891
CR 75; Opp. 47 - 1892
CR 76; Opp.
CR 77; Opp. 
CR 78; Opp.
CR 79; Opp.51 – 1895
CR 80; Opp.52 – 1895
 CR 81; Opp.53 – 1895
 CR 82; Opp.54 – 1895
CR 83; Opp.55 – 1896
CR 84; Opp. 56 - 1896
CR 85; Opp.57 –1897
CR 86-87; Opp.58-19 – 1900

Series III: Huldreich Zwinglis, Sämtliche Werke - Volumes 88-101

CR 88; Werke 1 – 1904
CR 89; Werke 2 – 1907
CR 94; Werke 7 – 1911

Notes

References

 An English-language finding guide to John Calvin Opera quae supersunt omnia, edited by Guilielmus Baum, Eduardus Cunitz, and Eduardus Reuss; Calvin Opera 1-59, Corpus reformatorum 29-88, Brunswick and Berlin, 1863-1900, John Lee Thompson, Pasadena, Calif.,  John L. Thompson, 1995

External links
 Joannis Calvini opera quae supersunt omnia - Complete set of PDFs from the Université de Genève
 Concerning Bibliography, (xix) - The New Schaff-Herzog Encyclopedia of Religious Knowledge
 Philip Melanchthon. Literature (Portrait) - History of the Christian Church, Vol. 7 - Philip Schaff
 Select Bibliography Of the Reformation (2.1.3.) - Westminster Seminary California
 Complete Works of Calvin from the Corpus Reformatorum on CD - The Instituut voor Reformatieonderzoek (Institute for Reformation Research) - Apeldoorn.
 Many volumes of Calvin's works in the Corpus Reformatorum via Google Books
 Exegetical works of Zwingli: critical edition in the Corpus Reformatorum, voll. C-CIX
 Online Calvini Opera - 59 vols Latin&Franc Text&Jpg

Protestant theology
Latin prose texts
16th-century books
Series of books
16th-century Christian texts